HMC ML Q053 was a wooden Fairmile B Motor Launch (ML) upgunned submarine chaser delivered to the Royal Canadian Navy (RCN) on 17 November 1941. Originally designed for the Royal Navy by W.J. Holt of the British Admiralty and built by British boatbuilder Fairmile Marine, during the Second World War eighty Fairmile B motor launches were built in Canada for service with the Coastal Forces of the RCN.

Design 

Built of double mahogany (diagonally) with an eight-inch oak keel and based on a line of destroyer hulls, the Fairmiles arrived in prefabricated kits to be assembled for the RCN by thirteen different boatyards. In contrast to the British built boats, the Canadian Fairmiles were narrower, had a greater draught, and were slightly more powerful giving the Canadian boats a two knot speed advantage over the British boats. With a fuel capacity of 2,320 gallons of 87 octane gasoline, the early Fairmiles (Q050 to Q111) were powered by two 650 hp engines, could reach a top speed of 20 knots (max), 16.5 knots sea speed and a range of 1925 miles at 7.5 knots. Later versions (Q112 to Q129) were fitted with larger 700 hp engines able to achieve a top speed to 22 knots (max), with a range of 1925 miles at 7.5 knots. Crewed by two or three officers and fourteen sailors, accommodation on the Fairmiles was thought to be "cramped but comfortable".

Another unique design feature of the Fairmile B was that with forty-eight hours notice each boat could be reconfigured to serve in a different role. Fitted with steel strips and tapped holes to ease equipment swaps, weapons and specialist gear such as torpedo tubes, mines, depth charges, and guns could be quickly stripped and attached to the boat. In two days, a Fairmile could have its weapons and equipment reconfigured to serve as an escort, minesweeper, minelayer, navigation leader, coastal raider, patrol boat, ambulance or rescue launch. "Armament consisted of three 20mm Oerlikon guns, mounted forward, aft and amidships; two .303 machine-guns; one 9mm Sten gun; two .303 rifles; three .45 revolvers; and 20 depth-charges of 300 Ibs each, including eight fitted for the "Y" gun. Each boat was equipped with sonar, radar and WIT."

The first thirty-six Canadian Fairmile B type were designated and painted up as CML 01-36 (Coastal Motor Launch).

Fairmile Flotillas 

Affectionately known as The Little Ships, Little Fighting Ships or Q-Boats by their crews, during the Second World War the Fairmile B Motor Launches of the RCN played a vital role escorting shipping along the St. Lawrence River, in the Gulf of St. Lawrence, and between Newfoundland and the mainland of Canada. Regularly deployed in flotillas of six The Little Ships relieved larger escort craft urgently needed elsewhere by carrying out anti-submarine patrols, port defence and rescue duties. Based out of shore establishments on the St. Lawrence River, Halifax, Saint John, Shelburne, Sydney and on the West Coast; at sea the RCN Fairmile Fleets were accompanied by two "mother ships" HMCS Preserver (F94) and HMCS Provider (F100) providing fresh water, fuel and medical services.

Operational history 
While she flew the White Ensign, ML Q053 was not a commissioned ship of the RCN, but was rather listed as a tender to escort depot ship HMCS Sambro. Listed as part of the 71st Flotilla - Halifax L.D. Force, on 8 June 1943 Q053 was credited with recovering an intact mine laid in the Halifax approaches by German submarine U-119. While following minesweeper HMS Byms 2189 (J 989), the crew of Q053 observed a floating mine cut loose by the sweeper and with a ninety yard tow line attached, moved the mine to Ketch Harbour. Not knowing if the mine was magnetic or time-fuzed to explode after surfacing, during the long tow to harbour, the crew of Q053 were kept forward under cover. Once the mine was brought ashore, Lieutenant (Temp) George Rundle (RCNR) with the assistance of Leading Seaman Lancien, removed the access plate to the mine, cut the electrical wiring and extracted the detonator and primer. "For displaying gallantry, skill and coolness in carrying out hazardous duties" Lt George Rundle was awarded the George Medal and LS Lancien the British Empire Medal.

In December 1944, Q053 was listed as part of the RCN North-West Atlantic Command Gaspé Force (Administered by N.O. i/c., Gaspé), 71st Motor Launch Flotilla. After the war, she was sold for C$7,900 and renamed Aloma III under new ownership with the War Assets Corporation (WAC) to Marine Industries Ltd. Sorel (MIL). She was later sold to Consolidated Shipbuilding Corp., Morris Heights, N.Y.. Her final disposition is unknown.

Gallery

See also 

 Coastal Forces of the Royal Canadian Navy
 Canadian Fairmile B Motor Launch
 Fairmile B Motor Launch

References 

Royal Canadian Navy Fairmile B motor launch boats of World War II
1941 ships